Ignazio Benito Maria La Russa  (born 18 July 1947) is an Italian politician who is serving as President of the Senate of the Republic since 13 October 2022. He is the first politician with a neo-fascist background to hold the position of President of the Senate, the second highest-ranking office of the Italian Republic.

La Russa also served as Minister of Defence in the Berlusconi IV Cabinet from 2008 to 2011, and as Vice President of the Senate of the Republic from 2018 until 2022. Moreover, during his long-time career, he held various posts within his parties. In 2008, he became acting president of the National Alliance, which on 29 March 2009 merged into The People of Freedom, of which he was one of the three national coordinators until 17 December 2012, when he launched Brothers of Italy (FdI). From 4 April 2013 to 8 March 2014, La Russa served as president of FdI.

Early life and family
Ignazio La Russa was born in Paternò, near Catania, Sicily, in 1947. His father, Antonino La Russa, served as secretary of the National Fascist Party (PNF) for Paternò during the 1940s and joined the Italian Social Movement (MSI) after the war, being elected to the Parliament several times. La Russa had two brothers, both of them involved in politics: Vincenzo, a former senator for Christian Democracy (DC), and Romano, a former member of the European Parliament for the MSI's legal successor, the National Alliance.

When he was 13, his family moved to Milan, where his father was a practising lawyer. After attending college in St. Gallen, a German-speaking Swiss canton, he obtained a degree in law at the University of Pavia. After serving as a Regular Army Reserve Officer, he has worked as a criminal defence lawyer at the Supreme Court of Cassation. He is married to Laura De Cicco and has three sons: Geronimo, Lorenzo, and Leonardo.

Political career
During his youth, La Russa joined the neo-fascist Italian Social Movement (MSI), and was involved in nationalist activism in Milan. In 1971, he became one of the main leaders of the newly-formed Youth Front (FdG), the youth section of the MSI.  On 12 April 1973, during a demonstration organized by the MSI against what they called "red violence", two hand grenades were thrown, one of which killed the 22-year-old policeman Antonio Marino. La Russa was accused of being one of the "moral perpetrators" of the bombings.

In the 1985 Lombard regional election, La Russa was elected regional councillor for the Milan district, gaining 24,096 votes. In the 1990 Lombard regional election, he was re-elected to the council with 13,807 votes. In 1987, La Russa became the lawyer of Sergio Ramelli's family, a young member of the MSI who was assassinated by far-leftist communist militants. Moreover, from 1989 to 1994, he was town councillor in San Donato Milanese, near Milan.

Member of the Parliament

In the 1992 Italian general election, La Russa was elected both to the Chamber of Deputies with 26,098 votes for the constituency of Milan–Pavia, and to the Senate of the Republic for the constituency of Milan II with 4,943 votes. After the election, he left the Lombardy Regional Council, and choose to be a member of the Chamber of Deputies. The electoral law of that time allowed a candidate to run for election as representative for both the Senate and the Chamber: if the candidate obtained sufficient votes to be elected to both, he had to opt for one of the two houses.

In 1994, the MSI merged with conservative factions of the former Christian Democracy and the Italian Liberal Party, forming a new party called National Alliance (AN) which was launched in 1994 but was officially founded in January 1995. Former MSI members dominated the new party, and the MSI's last leader, Gianfranco Fini, was elected the new party's first leader. Fini appointed La Russa vice president of the party. In the 1994 Italian general election, which was won by Silvio Berlusconi's centre-right coalition, La Russa was re-elected to the Chamber and appointed deputy speaker of the house.

In the 1996 Italian general election won by Romano Prodi's centre-left coalition, La Russa was re-elected to the Chamber for the single-member constituency of Milan  with 41,598 votes. In the legislature, La Russa was appointed chairman of the "Committee on Parliamentary Immunity", an office he held until 2001. In the 2001 Italian general election, which was won by the centre-right, he was once again elected to the Chamber for the district of Milan 2 with 41,158 votes. On 5 June 2001, La Russa became the leader of AN's deputies, a position that he held until 8 October 2003 and again between November 2004 and July 2005. In the 2006 Italian general election, he was confirmed at the Chamber of Deputies for the constituency of Lombardy 1.

Minister of Defence

In the run-up to the 2008 Italian general election, AN merged with Berlusconi's Forza Italia forming The People of Freedom (PdL), which La Russa joined, becoming party's national coordinator along with Sandro Bondi and Denis Verdini. On 8 May 2008, after being re-elected to the Chamber, La Russa was appointed Minister of Defence in the Berlusconi IV Cabinet, a office thet he held until 16 November 2011 when Berlusconi resigned. Moreover, La Russa ran in the 2009 European Parliament election in the North-Western Italy constituency, being elected with 223,986 votes but decided to renounce his seat in favor of that in the Chamber of Deputies.

In November 2009, La Russa challenged the judgement of the Lautsi v. Italy of the European Court of Human Rights, which contested the display of the crucifix in Italian classrooms. He said: "The crucifix will remain in all the classrooms. They can die, they can die, they and those fake international organizations that count for nothing." Following an appeal by Italy, the first degree judgement was finally overturned. At the end of 2009, with the 2010 financial law, La Russa launched Difesa Servizi S.p.A. a company with the aim of enhancing the defense's brand and assets.

La Russa was among the main supporters of the 2011 military intervention in Libya against the regime of Muammar Gaddafi, which was initially opposed by Prime Minister Berlusconi due to his long-time friendship with the de facto leader of Libya since 1969. Furthermore, he was in favor of a ceasefire intervention by Italy in the Russo-Georgian War. As minister, La Russa issued the law 100/2009 and established the day of remembrance for the fallen soldiers in international peacekeeping missions.

On 2 May 2009, La Russa founded Our Right, a national-conservative faction within the PdL, which was soon disbanded when he formed Protagonist Italy, along with Maurizio Gasparri.

Co-founder of Brothers of Italy
On 21 December 2012, La Russa, along with Guido Crosetto and Giorgia Meloni, founded Brothers of Italy (FdI), a national-conservative party, split from the PdL because FdI considered Berlusconi and the PdL's secretary Angelino Alfano of being too close to Mario Monti's cabinet. In the 2013 Italian general election, he was once again elected to the Chamber. Moreover, on 4 April 2013, La Russa was appointed president of FdI, a position that he held until 8 March 2014, when he was replaced by Meloni. In the 2018 Italian general election, La Russa was elected to the Senate of the Republic for the single-member district of Rozzano gaining 137,793 votes. He became vice president of the Senate on 23 March 2018.

President of the Senate

The 2022 Italian general election was marked by a strong showing of FdI, which became the most voted party with 26% of votes; the centre-right coalition, led by Meloni, won an absolute majority in both houses. La Russa was re-elected to the Senate for the single-member constituency of Cologno Monzese with 239,720 votes.

On 13 October 2022, La Russa was elected President of the Senate of the Republic by obtaining 116 votes out of 206 in the first round. La Russa's candidacy was not supported by Berlusconi's Forza Italia, but he succeeded in being elected getting votes from members of the opposition parties. The first post-fascist elected to the position, La Russa was proclaimed president by Liliana Segre, a senator for life and Holocaust survivor, who presided the Senate's session due to her being the oldest senator.

On 11 December 2022, La Russa announced the proposal of a law aiming at introducing a voluntary military service for young people between 18 and 25 years old.

Political views
Often accused of being a neo-fascist politician, he has been described as far right; La Russa has described himself as a conservative. Throughout his entire political career, thanks to his professional background, he acted as spokesman for the Italian right-wing on justice-related subjects, as well as issues related to the security of citizens, immigration, reduction of the tax burden, and safeguarding national identity. La Russa has also expressed anti-communist views multiple times throughout his career.

Controversies

During his long-time career, La Russa has often been the protagonist of gaffes and controversies. A press conference of then Prime Minister Silvio Berlusconi held on 10 March 2010 was interrupted several times by the political activist Gian Rocco Carlomagno. La Russa, who had already invited him to leave the room, approached Carlomagno, pulling and pushing him towards the exit, while the protestor accused La Russa of being a fascist.

On 12 February 2011, La Russa kicked and insulted AnnoZero journalist Corrado Formigli, who wanted to ask him questions about Berlusconi's sex scandals. La Russa initially apologized for the statements but then accused Formigli of having kicked him in the back and Formigli was moved away by the security service. Moreover, La Russa was being investigated by Italy's Court of Audit for embezzlement in relation to the use of state flights to attend the football match between Inter Milan and Schalke 04 on 5 April 2011.

At the beginning of the COVID-19 pandemic in Italy, he had suggested on social networks to give up the unhygienic handshake to replace it with the fascist salute. During a television debate on 15 September, one week before the 2022 Italian general election, La Russa stated that "we are all heirs of the Duce." In his house in Milan, La Russa collects several statues and memorabilia of Benito Mussolini and his fascist movement, as well as photos and paintings about Italy's colonial campaigns.

In February 2023 he declared to have given his sister a bust of Benito Mussolini that he had received by his father and which he had kept at home for several years.

Electoral history

Notes

References

 
|-

|-

1947 births
People from Paternò
Living people
Politicians from Milan
Italian Social Movement politicians
National Alliance (Italy) politicians
The People of Freedom politicians
Brothers of Italy politicians
Italian Ministers of Defence
Italian neo-fascists
Deputies of Legislature XI of Italy
Deputies of Legislature XII of Italy
Deputies of Legislature XIII of Italy
Deputies of Legislature XIV of Italy
Deputies of Legislature XV of Italy
Deputies of Legislature XVI of Italy
Deputies of Legislature XVII of Italy
Senators of Legislature XVIII of Italy
University of Pavia alumni
Vice presidents of the Senate (Italy)
Presidents of the Italian Senate